William Morgan Jenkins (4 June 1914 – 9 October 2001) was an Australian rules footballer who played with Richmond in the Victorian Football League (VFL).

Notes

External links 
		

1914 births
Australian rules footballers from Victoria (Australia)
Richmond Football Club players
2001 deaths